Pompei 2000, often known as Ditta Pompei simply as Pompei, is an Italian manufacturer of shoes for film and stage productions. Founded in 1932 by cousins Ernesto and Luigi Pompei, it has primarily served Cinecittà film productions. In the 1960s, it manufactured classical foot gear for the numerous sword and sandal epics being made at Cinecittà. Since the 1970s when the company was passed down to Ernesto's son, Carlo Pompei. Their stock consists of approximately 800,000 thousand shoes.

Based in Rome, Pompei also has branches in Paris and London.

List of notable projects

References
Official Site
L.C.P. di Pompei, page at IMDb

Clothing companies established in 1932
Film organisations in Italy
Clothing companies of Italy
Manufacturing companies based in Rome
1932 establishments in Italy